Apaneca is a municipality in the Ahuachapán department of El Salvador. 

It has an area of 45.13 square kilometers. Its population is of 8,597 inhabitants (Estimated 2006). The municipality is divided in 7 cantons: 

El Saltillal
Palo Verde
Quezalapa
San Ramoncito
Taltapanca
Tizapa
Tulapa

Towns
Santa Leticia

See also
Concepcion de Ataco
La Palma
Antiguo Cuscatlan
Ahuachapan, El Salvador

Municipalities of the Ahuachapán Department